Oscar Montañés (18 April 1912 – 1985) was an Argentine footballer. He played in 15 matches for the Argentina national football team from 1937 to 1942. He was also part of Argentina's squad for the 1942 South American Championship.

References

1912 births
1985 deaths
Argentine footballers
Argentina international footballers
Place of birth missing
Association football defenders
Club de Gimnasia y Esgrima La Plata footballers